Hell Comes to Your House is an American deathrock and punk compilation of Southern California bands. It is notable for releasing the first ever Christian Death song "Dogs", as well as including the first studio recordings of Social Distortion and one of the earliest performances of Redd Kross.

The album was originally released in 1981 but reissued in 1998. The 1981 release goes for about $50.

Engineer Randy Burns went on to produce other punk, thrash and death metal bands including Suicidal Tendencies, Death, Possessed, and Megadeth.

The album credits the producer of "Dogs" as Mike Patton. This is not the Ipecac Recordings label head/Faith No More singer, Mike Patton. This Mike Patton was in the band Middle Class and he also produced The Blue Album by the influential Orange County band, Adolescents as well as the Danger Zone EP by China White. He was also the bass player with T.S.O.L.'s Jack Grisham's post TSOL Goth/Dance band, Cathedral of Tears and Trotsky Icepick.

Track listing
 "Lude Boy" - Social Distortion
 "Telling Them" - Social Distortion
 "Daddy's Gone Mad" - Legal Weapon
 "Puss 'n' Boots" - Red Cross
 "Out of My Head" - Modern Warfare	
 "Street Fightin' Man" - Modern Warfare
 "Deception" - Secret Hate	
 "New Routine/Suicide" - Secret Hate
 "Suburban Bitch" - The Conservatives
 "Just Cuz/Nervous" - The Conservatives	
 "Evil" - 45 Grave
 "Concerned Citizen" - 45 Grave
 "45 Grave" - 45 Grave
 "Dogs" - Christian Death
 "Reject Yourself" - 100 Flowers
 "Marry It" - Rhino 39
 "Death on the Elevator" - Super Heroines
 "Embalmed Love" - Super Heroines

See also
List of punk rock compilation albums

1981 compilation albums
Hardcore punk compilation albums